Andrew James Calof (born May 9, 1991) is a Canadian professional ice hockey forward who is currently playing with Lausanne HC in the National League (NL).

Early and personal life
Calof was born in Ottawa, Ontario, Canada, and is Jewish. His parents are Jonathan (a professor at the University of Ottawa) and Lois Calof (an office manager), and he has a brother Michael. He attended Sir Robert Borden High School, and was on the Ontario Provincial soccer team.

Playing career

In 2007 he was drafted in round 9 (#175 overall) by the Mississauga IceDogs in the Ontario Hockey League Priority Selection.

Playing for the Nepean Raiders, in 2008-09 he was a Canadian Junior Hockey League First All-Star Team and was the CJHL Top Prospect of the Year, and in 2009-10 he was CJHL Scholastic Player of the Year and was the MVP of the CJHL All-Star Game. He won the fastest skater competition at the National Junior A All-Star competition.

Calof opted to attended Princeton University, where he played with the Princeton Tigers men's ice hockey team which competed in NCAA's Division I in the ECAC Hockey conference for four seasons. In his freshman year (2010–11), Calof was named the ECAC Rookie of the Year, to the ECAC All-Rookie Team, and ECAC Third All Star Team. In 2011-12 he was All-Ivy League Second Team and in 2012–13 he was ECAC Second All-Star Team and All-Ivy League First Team. He competed for Team Canada at the 2013 Maccabiah Games in Israel, winning a gold medal while averaging 2.0 points per game with 10 points on five goals and five assists in five games.

Following his NCAA career, Calof continued his playing career signing with top Swedish club, Skellefteå AIK of the SHL. During the 2014–15 SHL season, Calof recorded 16 goals and 19 assists, gaining him attention for the SHL Rookie of the Year award.

After three seasons with Skellefteå AIK, Calof signed with fellow SHL club, Växjö Lakers on a one-year deal on April 10, 2017  playing a role in Växjö's 2017–18 SHL championship. Following the successful campaign with the Lakers, Calof joined Torpedo Nizhny Novgorod of the KHL for the 2018–19 season. After spending the 2019–20 season with Traktor Chelyabinsk, Calof opted to return to Sweden for a second stint with Växjö Lakers.

After claiming a second championships with the Lakers during his two season stint, Calof left the SHL and signed a one-year contract with German club, Schwenninger Wild Wings of the Deutsche Eishockey Liga (DEL) on May 18, 2022. However before joining the club, Calof terminated his contract with the Wild Wings in order to sign a lucrative one-year contract to return to the KHL with Amur Khabarovsk on August 1, 2022.

In the 2022-23 season, Calof made just 16 appearances with Amur in registering 2 points before opting to terminate his contract with the club on December 9, 2022. He would later join as a free agent Swiss club, Lausanne HC of the NL, signing for the remainder of the season on February 16, 2023.

Career statistics

Awards and honours

See also
List of select Jewish ice hockey players

References

External links

1991 births
Living people
21st-century Canadian Jews
Amur Khabarovsk players
Canadian ice hockey centres
Canadian expatriate ice hockey players in Sweden
Competitors at the 2013 Maccabiah Games
Ice hockey people from Ottawa
Jewish ice hockey players
Jewish Canadian sportspeople
Lausanne HC players
Maccabiah Games gold medalists for Canada
Nepean Raiders players
Princeton Tigers men's ice hockey players
Skellefteå AIK players
Torpedo Nizhny Novgorod players
Traktor Chelyabinsk players
Växjö Lakers players